Harold Hunter Armstrong (April 9, 1884 – July 11, 1979) was an American writer. He also wrote under the name Henry G. Aikman.

Bibliography

 "The Groper" (1919) (As Henry G. Aikman)
 "Zell: A Novel" (As Henry G. Aikman) (1921)
 "For Richer, For Poorer" (1922)

References

1884 births
1979 deaths
American male novelists
20th-century American novelists
20th-century American male writers